Anupam Nath is an international photojournalist from Assam. Nath's photo has been selected for the Time magazine's top 100 photos of 2017 list. He currently works as a photographer at Associated Press.

Career 
Nath has been covering events and happenings of the entire northeastern region of Assam since  1995.
Starting his career as a photo journalist with a couple of Assamese dailies, Anupam went on to work as a stringer in Outlook.
Later he worked as a staff photographer for the Hindustan Times and The Telegraph before joining the Associated Press in 2000.

References 

Indian photojournalists
Indian photographers
1971 births
20th-century Indian photographers
21st-century Indian photographers
Living people